Tae-il is a Korean masculine given name. Its meaning differs based on the hanja used to write each syllable of the name. There are 20 hanja with the reading "tae" and ten hanja with the reading "il" on the South Korean government's official list of hanja which may be registered for use in given names.

People with this name include:
Jeon Tae-il (1948–1970), South Korean activist who burned himself to death in protest of the poor working conditions in South Korean factories
Yoon Tae-il (born 1964), South Korean handball player
Chang Tae-il (born 1965), South Korean boxer
Lee Tae-il (born 1990), South Korean singer, member of boy band Block B
Moon Tae-il (born 1994), South Korean singer, member of boy band NCT

Fictional characters with this name include:
Han Tae-il, in 2014 South Korean film Man in Love
Park Tae-il, in 2014 South Korean television series You're All Surrounded

See also
List of Korean given names

References

Korean masculine given names